Kabo or KABO may refer to:

Places
 Kabo, a town in the northern Central African Republic
 Kabo, Nigeria, a Local Government Area in Kano State
 Kabo Valley, a valley in the border region between Burma and Manipur
 Kabo Island, Philippines, in Surigao del Norte, Caraga Region of the Mindanao island group of the Philippines
 Kabo Island, Indonesia, in the Lesser Sunda Islands of Indonesia

People
 Kabo clan, a subgrouping of the Ijaw ethnic group of southern Nigeria

Things
 the Kabo meteorite of 1971, which fell in Kano, Nigeria (see meteorite falls)
 crystalline potassium aluminium borate (K2Al2B2O7)
 Gabo Reform, the sweeping reforms in Korea from 1894 to 1896. ("Gabo" is rendered as "Kabo" in the McCune–Reischauer Korean romanization system)